Microphysetica is a genus of moths of the family Crambidae. The genus was described by George Hampson in 1917.

Species
Microphysetica ambialis (Schaus, 1924)
Microphysetica hermeasalis (Walker, 1859)
Microphysetica peperita Hampson, 1917
Microphysetica rufitincta (Hampson, 1917)

References

Spilomelinae
Crambidae genera
Taxa named by George Hampson